The Massachusetts Senate is the upper house of the Massachusetts General Court, the bicameral state legislature of the Commonwealth of Massachusetts. The Senate comprises 40 elected members from 40 single-member senatorial districts in the state. All but one of the districts are named for the counties in which they are located (the "Cape and Islands" district covers Dukes, Nantucket, and parts of Barnstable counties). Senators serve two-year terms, without term limits. The Senate convenes in the Massachusetts State House, in Boston.

Qualifications
The following are the qualifications to be elected to the Massachusetts Senate:
 Be 18 years of age
 Be a registered voter in Massachusetts
 Be an inhabitant of Massachusetts for five years
 Be a resident of the district when elected
 Receive a least 300 signatures on nomination papers

Recent party control 
Democrats hold a supermajority in the Senate.

Current leadership

Current members and districts

Current committees and members

Past composition of the Senate

See also
 2023–2024 Massachusetts legislature
 List of former districts of the Massachusetts Senate
 Massachusetts Senate Delegations
 Massachusetts House of Representatives

References

Further reading
 , 2007

External links
Senate Members of the General Court official government website
Official Senate district definitions as of 2021
 2002 
2010, with names of senators
2011
State Senate of Massachusetts at Project Vote Smart